The 1961–62 season was the 60th in the history of the Western Football League.

The champions for the sixth time in their history were the returning Bristol City Reserves.

Final table
The league was reduced from 21 to 20 clubs after Bristol City Colts, Exeter City Reserves and Trowbridge Town Reserves left. Two new clubs joined:

Bridport
Bristol City Reserves, rejoining after leaving the league in 1948.

References

1961-62
5